Comet Lake Dam is a dam located on Nimissila Creek in the city of Green in Summit County, Ohio, at .  The reservoir created is called Comet Lake, and it drains into the upper Tuscarawas River by way of the Nimissila Creek.

References

Dams completed in 1922
Dams in Ohio